Hibiscus macilwraithensis, the Macilwraithe hibiscus, is shrub growing from one to four metres tall. Endemic to Cape York Peninsula, Australia.

References

macilwraithensis
Flora of Queensland